Griva (Bulgarian and) is a small village located in the Kilkis regional unit in Central Macedonia, Greece. The village hovers on the southeastern portion of Mount Paiko at 470 meters (1541.1 feet) above sea level.

Griva, with a population of 770 people, is the largest village in the municipal unit of Goumenissa besides Goumenissa proper.

Because of the complete destruction of the village by the Ottomans in 1912 during the First Balkan War, there are no structures still existing that were built prior to this period. The village's architecture is the basic standard architecture for nearly all of the towns of the region, with narrow streets, small passageways between the buildings, and cottages fit perfectly into the natural environment of the mountainside. According to a Yugoslav study, in 1961 of a population of 1,280, an estimated 1,180 Macedonian speakers lived in the village alongside 100 Pontic Greeks.

Demographics
According to the National Statistical Center of Greece, in 1981, 1991 and 2001, the population of Griva is as follows:

Location

Economy
Local agriculture produces chestnuts, sheep, and timber.

Education
Griva had one primary school and one elementary school but they both closed down due to the low number of students.

Culture
Filmography: In 1981, director Tasos Psaras filmed The Factory (Greek : Το Εργοστάσιο)(French : L 'Ucine) in various places within Griva.

Churches

Church of St. Athanasius the Great
Monastery of St. Raphael, Nicholas & Irene at Griva (established 1992).

References

External links
 Official website
 e-Press
 Weather Forecast Griva
 Satellite Image

Populated places in Kilkis (regional unit)